Burnet Municipal Airport , also known as Kate Craddock Field, is a city-owned public-use airport located one nautical mile (1.85 km) southwest of the central business district of Burnet, a city in Burnet County, Texas, United States.

Although most U.S. airports use the same three-letter location identifier for the FAA and IATA, this airport is assigned BMQ by the FAA but has no designation from the IATA (which assigned BMQ to Bamburi, Kenya).

Facilities and aircraft 
It has one asphalt paved runway designated 1/19 which measures 5,000 by 75 feet (1,524 x 23 m).

Faulkner's Air Shop is the fixed-base operator (FBO). Avgas and jet fuel are available.

For the 12-month period ending September 5, 2007, the airport had 31,200 aircraft operations, an average of 85 per day: 98% general aviation and 2% military. At that time, there were 43 aircraft based at this airport: 93% single-engine and 7% multi-engine.

Accidents and incidents
On July 21, 2018, a Douglas C-47B N47HL of the Commemorative Air Force crashed on take-off and was destroyed by fire. All thirteen people on board survived.

References

External links 
 Bluebonnet Air Show at Burnet Municipal Airport
 Commemorative Air Force, Highland Lakes Squadron at Burnet Municipal Airport
 Aerial photo as of 27 January 1995 from USGS The National Map
 

Airports in Texas
Buildings and structures in Burnet County, Texas
Transportation in Burnet County, Texas